The canton of Saint-Étienne-5 (before 2015: Saint-Étienne-Nord-Est-2) is a French administrative division located in the department of Loire and the Auvergne-Rhône-Alpes region. It has the following communes:
Saint-Étienne (partly)
Saint-Jean-Bonnefonds
Saint-Priest-en-Jarez

See also
Cantons of the Loire department

References

Cantons of Loire (department)